Centre for Effective and Sustainable Transport Infrastructure (CESTI) is a research project focused on technical innovations aimed at elimination of deficiencies in today’s transport infrastructure. It deals with road and railway transport network including bridges and tunnels. Environmental issues, aspects of safety and reliability of structures and effective management systems are addressed comprehensively. The project responds to the requirements for cost efficient, material and energy sustainable, resilient, reliable, smart and accessible transport infrastructure. For more details, visit www.cesti.cz.

The project is supported by Competence Centres program of Technology Agency of the Czech Republic (TA CR), project no. TE01020168. The activities of CESTI Centre were initiated by kick-off meeting on 11 April 2013.

The leading participant of the project is Faculty of Civil Engineering, Czech Technical University in Prague. There is a total of 21 organizations from civil engineering area involved in the project (universities, research institutes, companies).

External links 
 CESTI website

Transport organizations based in the Czech Republic